Sgurr an Fhidhleir (705 m) is a mountain in the Northwest Highlands of Scotland. It lies in the Coigach area of Ross and Cromarty.

Its summit lies atop a spectacular vertical 500m high cliff. It is usually climbed in conjunction with the neighbouring Ben More Coigach. The nearest settlements are Badenscallie (5 km to the west) and other locations along the coast road south from Achiltibuie. The nearest larger settlement is Ullapool.

References

External links
Walk Highlands entry, including pronunciation

Marilyns of Scotland
Grahams
Mountains and hills of the Northwest Highlands